Guerino Gottardi (born 18 December 1970) is a Swiss former professional footballer who played as a midfielder. He also holds Italian nationality.

Career
Born in Bern, Gottardi began his career in Switzerland with BSC Young Boys. After joining Italian club Lazio in 1995 from Swiss side Neuchâtel Xamax, Gottardi was often used as a "supersub" and was instrumental in Lazio's 1997–98 Coppa Italia victory. With Lazio losing 2–0 on aggregate, Gottardi came off the bench to win a penalty, and then score before Alessandro Nesta's winner gave Lazio a 3–2 aggregate victory over A.C. Milan in the final. Gottardi is also remembered for an outstanding performance against cross-city rivals Roma when he scored in the final minute of their second leg Coppa Italia clash, giving Lazio their third consecutive win against their arch rivals in the 1998–99 season.

Honours
Lazio
 Serie A: 1999–2000
 Coppa Italia: 1997–98, 1999–2000, 2003–04
 Supercoppa Italiana: 1998, 2000
 UEFA Cup Winners' Cup: 1998–99
 UEFA Super Cup: 1999

References

1970 births
Living people
Footballers from Bern
Italian footballers
Swiss men's footballers
Swiss people of Italian descent
Association football defenders
BSC Young Boys players
Neuchâtel Xamax FCS players
S.S. Lazio players
Swiss Super League players
Serie A players